In the election for Head of State of Costa Rica held on 1 January 1829 Juan Mora Fernández is reelected in his position by the majority of Electors.  The elections in this period were conducted in two levels, first all Costa Ricans capable of voting according to the Constitution (men able to read and write, among other things) who cast a public vote chose the Electores according to the proportional representation of the population of each location; 11 for San José, 9 for Alajuela, 8 for Cartago, 8 for Heredia, 3 for Escazú, 3 for Ujarrás and 3 for the recently annexed Nicoya. Mora received the unanimous vote of all the provinces except for 2 electoral votes in San José, 1 in Alajuela and 2 in Heredia.

References

Elections in Costa Rica
1829 elections in Central America
1829 in Costa Rica